Andriy Oleksandrovych Bednyakov (born March 21, 1987, Mariupol, Ukrainian SSR) is a  Ukrainian actor and TV presenter, best known for the television show Oryol i Reshka.

Biography 
Andriy Bednyakov born March 21, 1987 in Mariupol, Ukrainian SSR. After high school, Andrey worked for three years as an electrical mechanic at Mariupol Ilyich. While working at the factory, he absentia received higher education at Kharkiv University of Internal Affairs, after which he moved to Kyiv. He played in the top league of KVN Ukrainian.

From 2011 to 2013 —  co-host of the show Oryol i Reshka on TV channel Inter. Actor of Ukrainian version of the TV show Big Difference.

In 2014 he became co-host of the Big Question, and since September 2014 - leading the new transmission BogachBednyak and Blockbusters on TV Pyatnica! (Russia).

February 8, 2015 started showing the jubilee, the 10th season of the program Oryol i Reshka in which Andriy Bednyakov people took part, along with other colleagues on the show. August 17, 2015 aired the second part of the  Jubilee  season Oryol i Reshka, where Andrey was the co-host again.
On October 30, 2015 leads a new transmission travel —  I believe —  I do not believe,  which tells of five interesting facts about the country, which is dedicated to the issue, one of which - false.

Personal life 
 Wife —  actress and television presenter Anastasia Korotkaya
 Daughter —  Ksenia (born September 20, 2015)

Following the 2022 Russian invasion of Ukraine, Bednyakov distributed humanitarian aid to war-torn Donetsk Oblast.

TV shows

Filmography

References

External links
 Andriy Bedniakov
 Андрей Бедняков: «Орел и решка» будет. Но без меня
 Андрей Бедняков: вокруг света за монету!

1987 births
Living people
People from Mariupol
Russian television presenters
Ukrainian television presenters
21st-century Ukrainian male actors
Ukrainian parodists
Ukrainian humanitarians